Hubert Jones was a flying ace.

Hubert Jones may also refer to:

Hubert Jones (rugby union)

See also
Hubert Cunliffe-Jones
Bert Jones (disambiguation)